Yevsina is a rural locality (a village) in Beloyevskoye Rural Settlement, Kudymkarsky District, Perm Krai, Russia. The population was 17 as of 2010.

Geography 
Yevsina is located 27 km northwest of Kudymkar (the district's administrative centre) by road. Miteva is the nearest rural locality.

References 

Rural localities in Kudymkarsky District